My Home may refer to:

Films 
 Mera Pind, a 2008 Punjabi romantic musical comedy film

Music
 "Kde domov můj?", My Home, an overture by Antonín Dvořák
 My Home (traditional pipe tune)

Songs 
 "My Home" (song), Japanese song by Kanjani Eight
 "My Home", 1962 song by Christine Campbell; written by Ruvin, Ladbrooke, James	 
 "My Home", 1974 song by The Sensational Nightingales, written by Charles Johnson
 "My Home", 1988 song by Kamahl; written by Jackie Trent, Tony Hatch
 "My Home", 2012 song by Nneka

See also
 "My Hometown", a 1984 single by Bruce Springsteen from the Born in the U.S.A. album